Valeria Cotelo  (born 26 March 1984) is an Argentine women's international footballer who plays as a defender. She is a member of the Argentina women's national football team. She was part of the team at the 2003 FIFA Women's World Cup and 2007 FIFA Women's World Cup. On club level she plays for Boca Juniors in Argentina.

References

1984 births
Living people
Argentine women's footballers
Argentina women's international footballers
Place of birth missing (living people)
Women's association football defenders
Footballers at the 2003 Pan American Games
Pan American Games competitors for Argentina
2003 FIFA Women's World Cup players
Footballers at the 2007 Pan American Games
2007 FIFA Women's World Cup players